Eutaxia is a genus of the family Fabaceae. They are native to Australia. Most are endemic to the Southwest Botanical Province of Western Australia, but a few are distributed throughout mainland Australia. The chromosome number of Eutaxia species is typically 2n = 14 or 16.

Species
Eutaxia comprises the following species:

Section Eutaxia R.Br.

 Eutaxia cuneata Meissner

 Eutaxia epacridoides Meisn.

 Eutaxia exilis C.F.Wilkins & G.R.Hend.
 Eutaxia hirsuta C.F.Wilkins & Chappill
 Eutaxia inuncta C.F.Wilkins & Chappill
 Eutaxia lasiophylla G.R.Hend.
 Eutaxia lutea Chappill & G.R.Hend.
 Eutaxia major (Benth.) C.F.Wilkins & Chappill
 Eutaxia myrtifolia R. Br.
 Eutaxia neurocalyx (Turcz.) Chappill & G.R.Hend.
 subsp. nacta C.F.Wilkins
 subsp. neurocalyx (Turcz.) Chappill & G.R.Hend.
 subsp. papillosa C.F.Wilkins
 Eutaxia parvifolia Benth.

 Eutaxia virgata Benth.

Section Sclerothamnus (R.Br.) F.Muell.
 Eutaxia acanthoclada G.R.Hend. & Chappill
 Eutaxia actinophylla Chappill & C.F.Wilkins

 Eutaxia andocada Chappill & C.F.Wilkins
 Eutaxia diffusa F.Muell.—Spreading eutaxia
 Eutaxia empetrifolia Schltdl.
 Eutaxia lasiocalyx Chappill & C.F.Wilkins
 Eutaxia leptophylla Turcz.
 Eutaxia microphylla (R.Br.) C.H.Wright & Dewar—Common eutaxia
 Eutaxia nanophylla Chappill & C.F.Wilkins
 Eutaxia rubricarina Chappill & C.F.Wilkins

References

External links
 

 
Fabales of Australia
Fabaceae genera